The Alaska-Gastineau Mine (alternate: Perseverance Mine) was a gold mine in Perseverance, about  east of Juneau, Alaska, USA.  It was briefly the largest gold mine in the world. The mine was operated by the Alaska-Gastineau Mining Company.

Geography

The Alaska-Gastineau Mine was located within the Silver Bow Basin. Its concentrating plant was situated near Thane. The mine had a  shaft running through Mount Roberts that reached the Perseverance Mine near Gold Creek. It adjoined the Alaska-Juneau Mine. The mine's low-grade ore is situated on a mountain above the Gastineau Channel. According to Jackling, the block of ore had at least 100,000,000 tons above sea level. The property consisted of a group of claims whose lode system covered . It was operated on a 6,000-ton daily capacity.

History
The mine's large scale development began in 1912. In 1913, while it was under construction, Emile Gastonguay was hired as the mine's chief electrician by managing director, Daniel C. Jackling. Bartlett L. Thane was the manager. Becoming unprofitable, it was shut down in 1921.

Features
For a period of time preceding World War I, the Alaska-Gastineau Mine was the largest gold mine in the world. Its mills were said to be the largest and most modern gold-crushing plant in the world. For its time, the ore was handled more economically than in any other Northwest mine.  "The mill avoided chemical processing with cyanide (cyanidation) or mercury amalgamation circuits by smelting all the concentrate."

References

Gold mines in the United States
Buildings and structures in Juneau, Alaska
Gold mining in Alaska
1912 establishments in Alaska
1921 disestablishments in Alaska
Mines in Alaska